Ukrainian Kazakhstanis are an ethnic minority in Kazakhstan that according to the 1989 census numbered 896,000 people, or 5.4% of the population. Due to subsequent emigration to Russia and Ukraine, this number had declined to 796,000 by 1998 and 456,997 in the 2009 census.

Ukrainians ocasionally called the lands in Northern Kazakhstan and Western Siberia as Grey Ukraine.

History 
Beginning in the end of the 18th century, several waves of both voluntary and involuntary Ukrainian settlers came to Kazakhstan.  The first Ukrainians to arrive were exiled Haidamaks, members of paramilitary Ukrainian peasant and Cossack bands, who were sent by the Russian government to Kazakhstan after their failed uprising in 1768.  

More significant in terms of their contribution to the Ukrainian ethnic group in Kazakhstan were a large wave of settlers who beginning in the late nineteenth century arrived from almost all of the regions of Ukraine that had been part of the Russian Empire at that time.  Seeking more opportunities and free land, these voluntary emigrants numbered approximately 100,000 people in Kazakhstan and adjacent regions of Russia by the turn of the century.  This movement escalated significantly following the agricultural reforms of Russian Prime Minister Pyotr Stolypin in the early 20th century.  Between 1897 and 1917, the proportion of the population of Kazakhstan that was of Ukrainian ethnicity increased from 1.9% to 10.5%.  They tended to settle in the regions of Kazakhstan that most resembled Ukraine, in the northern part of Kazakhstan.  By 1917, Ukrainians came to make up approximately 29.5% of the population of Akmola Province and 21.5% of the population of Turgai province. By 1926, according to the census, Kazakhstan was home to 860,000 Ukrainians.

In the 1930s during the Soviet process of collectivization, approximately 64,000 Ukrainian kulak (relatively wealthy peasant) families were forcibly resettled in Kazakhstan. Ukrainians in Kazakhstan had the second highest proportional death rate in the Kazakh famine of 1930–1933 after the Kazakhs themselves. The Ukrainian population in Kazakhstan decreased from 859,396 to 549,859 (a reduction of almost 36% of their population) while other ethnic minorities in Kazakhstan lost 12% and 30% of their populations.          
  
The first western Ukrainians were forcibly deported to Kazakhstan from the regions of Galicia and Volhynia when the Soviet Union annexed western Ukraine in 1939-1940.  They were followed by more deportees from western Ukraine, people who were accused of or having been members of the Organization of Ukrainian Nationalists.  Approximately 8,000 of the latter were sent to forced labor camps near Karaganda and many of them stayed there after having served their sentences. The descendants of the post-World War II Ukrainian immigrants tend to dominate the staffing of Kazakhstan's numerous Ukrainian cultural centers.

Society and culture 
In an effort to differentiate the Ukrainian and Russian communities in Kazakhstan, the Kazakh government has actively supported Ukrainian cultural aspirations. It has funded a Ukrainian newspaper.  Ukrainian organizations operate freely in Kazakhstan, and currently there are 20 Ukrainian cultural centers that sponsor Sunday schools, choirs, and folk dancing groups. Kazakhstan's capital, Astana, has a Ukrainian high school and Sunday school. The shared sufferings of the Kazakh and Ukrainian peoples at the hands of the Soviets are emphasized by Kazakh-Ukrainian activists.   

Although the Ukrainian language continues to be significant in rural areas with compact Ukrainian settlement, and is actively supported by the Kazakh government, the use of the Russian language has come to dominate within Kazakhstan's Ukrainian community. Due to assimilation with Russian culture, the proportion of the Ukrainian population in Kazakhstan who declare the Ukrainian language to be their mother tongue has declined from 78.7% in 1926 to only 36.6% today.  Most Ukrainians in Kazakhstan, when faced with pressure from the majority Kazakhs, have tended to unite with fellow Russian Slavs. There is thus somewhat of a cultural divide within Kazakhstan's Ukrainian community between those who maintain a Ukrainian political and cultural identity (largely descendants of mid 20th century immigrants) and those who have become culturally and linguistically Russified (the descendants of those who migrated to Kazakhstan earlier).    

The Ukrainian Greek Catholic Church began its existence in Kazakhstan when the first western Ukrainians were exiled there during and after World War II.  Centered in Karaganda, the Church services were conducted in people's homes until 1978, when the first Roman Catholic church was built.  The first Ukrainian Greek Catholic Church was built in 1996.  Currently, Kazakhstan has nine parishes of the Ukrainian Greek Catholic Church. The Ukrainian Greek Catholic community was visited in 2002 by the head of the Ukrainian Greek Catholic Church, Major archbishop Lubomyr Husar.

See also
 Kazakhstan–Ukraine relations

References 

Ethnic groups in Kazakhstan
European diaspora in Kazakhstan
Kazakhstan

Ukrainian diaspora in Asia